Sahar is a village in Sanhan District of Sanaa Governorate, Yemen. It is located in the 'uzlah of Wadi al-Ajbar.

History 
According to the 10th-century writer al-Hamdani, Sahar was part of the land given to the Banu Shihab by the Al Dhi Yazan. He also noted that it had a dam at the time of his writing.

Climate
Sahar has a cold, semi-arid climate, with most rainfall occurring in winter. The Köppen-Geiger climate classification is BSk. About  of precipitation falls annually.

References

Villages in Sanaa Governorate